"Data's Day" is the 85th episode of the American science fiction television series Star Trek: The Next Generation, the 11th episode of the fourth season. This episode introduces Keiko O'Brien and Data's pet cat, Spot.

Set in the 24th century, the series follows the adventures of the Starfleet crew of the  Federation starship Enterprise-D. In this episode, as Data contemplates the impending marriage of his friend Keiko Ishikawa to Transporter Chief Miles O'Brien, he learns about the peculiar minutiae – such as last-minute jitters and ballroom dancing – that surround human nuptials. At the same time, he investigates the apparent death of the Vulcan ambassador whom the Enterprise was ferrying to the Neutral Zone in order to conduct treaty negotiations with the Romulans.

Plot

While commanding the night shift aboard the Enterprise, Data (Brent Spiner) composes a letter to Commander Bruce Maddox detailing a normal day in his life with a focus on friendship.

Data mentions his involvement in the impending wedding of Transporter Chief Miles O'Brien (Colm Meaney) and civilian botanist Keiko Ishikawa (Rosalind Chao) where he had been asked to give the bride away. However, when visiting with Keiko she announces that she has decided to call it off, telling Data in frustration that it will make her happier. Data then delivers this news to Chief O'Brien, believing that since O'Brien wants to make Keiko happy, he will be pleased, which he is not. Geordi (LeVar Burton) assures Data that the wedding will proceed as planned.

Data discusses the Enterprise mission involving a Vulcan ambassador, T'Pel (Sierra Pecheur), who has arranged a secret meeting with a Romulan ship. Data is assigned as her escort while she is on board.

Data then asks Dr. Crusher (Gates McFadden) to teach him how to dance, having discovered from her service record that she won dance competitions. She agrees to instruct him on the condition that he not share this information with the rest of the crew, for fear of again being called 'The Dancing Doctor'.

Chief O'Brien asks Data to persuade Keiko to go through with the wedding. He fails yet again, and talks to Counselor Troi (Marina Sirtis) to try to understand Keiko's decision.

T'Pel asks Data about the Enterprise defense capabilities, which Data finds suspicious, but after Data informs her that he has the same safeguards as the ship's computer regarding reporting such requests to Captain Picard (Patrick Stewart), she drops the question, stating that she was interested only in testing Data's safeguards.  Because Vulcans do not lie, Data decides not to pursue the issue.

In the holodeck, Data almost instantly learns how to tap dance from Dr. Crusher before telling her that he is ready to dance at the wedding.  Telling him that tap dancing is inappropriate for social dancing she attempts to instruct him in ballroom dancing, but Data finds it much more difficult, as he cannot watch Dr. Crusher's feet. Dr. Crusher is then called away to sickbay to deliver a baby, and Data is left alone with a holographic partner.

The Enterprise rendezvous with a Romulan warbird and, despite Picard's unease about the situation, T'Pel transports aboard. However, something interrupts the transporter signal and the ambassador is killed.
 
Finding no flaw in the transporter system, Data uses the principles of Sherlock Holmes to come to the conclusion that T'Pel was not really killed: the Romulans beamed her off the ship themselves and left behind genetic material designed to fool the crew into thinking that she died in a transporter accident.

Picard speeds back to intercept the Romulans in the middle of the neutral zone.  He confronts the Romulan Admiral Mendak (Alan Scarfe) and learns that T'Pel is actually a Romulan spy. Before shots are fired, another Romulan warbird appears next to the first one and three more enter the sector, minutes away. Picard is forced to retreat into Federation space.

Data approaches Keiko to make amends. She informs him that she is not angry with him, and that the wedding will proceed as planned. Miles and Keiko are married by Captain Picard.

Data notes that although there are many emotions that he does not understand and cannot share, he does understand the emotion of love and belonging.

Later, in Sickbay, the captain and Data visit the newest member of the Enterprise crew—a baby born while the Enterprise was in mortal peril.

Production 
This was the first episode with Data's cat, Spot. The cat is not actually named until a later appearance.

Reception
WIRED magazine ranked "Data's Day" as one of the best of Star Trek: The Next Generation in a 2012 review. They praise masterful acting by Brent Spiner as Data throughout the episode, offering what they call a "Pinocchio perspective" on the plot. In 2019, ThoughtCo ranked "Data's Day" as the 7th best episode of this series, pointing out its special and emotional view of a day aboard the Enterprise-D. 

In 2019, Den of Geek noted this episode for featuring romantic elements, pointing out the wedding of Chief Miles O'Brien and Keiko. This episode was noted by the Chicago Tribune in 1996 for introducing the character of Keiko as played by actress Rosalind Chao, she was also featured as a reoccurring character on Star Trek: Deep Space Nine.

This episode was noted in To Boldly Go: Essays on Gender and Identity in the Star Trek Universe for featuring the marriage of Keiko and O'Brien, which was the only successful long term relationship in the entirety of Star Trek. They also note that their stories are continued on Star Trek: Deep Space Nine, and that they go on to have two children, Molly and Kirayoshi.

In 2019, Screen Rant ranked "Data's Day" the seventh funniest episode of Star Trek: The Next Generation. 

In 2020, Gamespot recommended this episode for background on the character of Data.

In 2021, Cinemablend ranked this one of the top ten episodes of TNG.

In 2021, Tom's Guide said this was a more "personal" episode that helped give the Star Trek universe "a new sense of reality".

Tor Books gave it 7 out of 10.

Home video 
"Data's Day" was released in the United States on September 3, 2002, as part of the Star Trek: The Next Generation season four DVD box set.

On April 23, 1996, this was released on LaserDisc in the United States, paired with "The Wounded" on one double-sided 12 inch disc.

References

 Star Trek The Next Generation DVD set, volume 4, disc 3, selection 3

External links
 

Star Trek: The Next Generation (season 4) episodes
1991 American television episodes
Television episodes written by Ronald D. Moore